Lampyris is a genus of beetles in the Lampyridae. In most of western Eurasia, they are the predominant members of this family and includes the European common glow-worm, which is the type species. They produce a continuous glow; the larvae and larviform females are among those organisms commonly called "glowworms".

This genus is rather close to Pleotomus and its relatives. These were formerly separated as tribe Pleotomini, but appear to be a specialized offshoot of the Lampyrini.

Species
BioLib includes the following species:
 Lampyris algerica Ancey, 1869
 Lampyris ambigena Jacquelin du Val, 1860
 Lampyris angustula Fairmaire, 1895
 Lampyris brutia Costa, 1882
 Lampyris fuscata Geisthardt, 1987
 Lampyris germariensis Jacquelin du Val, 1860
 Lampyris hellenica Geisthardt, 1983
 Lampyris iberica Geisthardt, Figueira, Day & De Cock, 2008
 Lampyris lareynii Jacquelin du Val, 1859
 Lampyris monticola Geisthardt, 2000
 Lampyris noctiluca (Linnaeus, 1767) - type species (as Cantharis noctiluca L. 1767)
 Lampyris orientalis Faldermann, 1835
 Lampyris pallida Geisthardt, 1987
 Lampyris pseudozenkeri Geisthardt, 1999
 Lampyris raymondi Mulsant & Rey, 1859
 Lampyris sardiniae Geisthardt, 1987
 Lampyris zenkeri Germar, 1817

References

External links
 

Lampyridae genera
Bioluminescent insects